Pharrell Lanscilo Williams (born April 5, 1973) is an American record producer, rapper, singer, and songwriter. Alongside close colleague Chad Hugo, he formed the hip hop and R&B production duo the Neptunes in the early 1990s, with whom he has produced songs for various recording artists. In 1999, he became lead vocalist of the band N.E.R.D., which he formed with Hugo and drummer Shay Haley. Williams has been widely referred to as one of the most influential and successful music producers of the 21st century, having had a significant impact on the sound of modern popular music.

Williams released his debut solo album, In My Mind, in 2006. In 2013, he produced and was featured alongside T.I. on the song "Blurred Lines" by Robin Thicke and his song "Happy" was the lead single for the soundtrack of the film Despicable Me 2; both songs reached the number one spot on the Billboard Hot 100 as well as other charts around the globe. In the same year, he was featured on Daft Punk's single "Get Lucky", which won Record of the Year and Best Pop Duo/Group Performance at the 56th Annual Grammy Awards. His second album, Girl, was released in 2014.

Williams has received numerous accolades and nominations. He has won 13 Grammy Awards, including three for Producer of the Year, Non-Classical (one as a member of the Neptunes). He is also a two-time Academy Award nominee: in 2014 for Best Original Song, for "Happy" (from Despicable Me 2); and in 2017 for Best Picture, as a producer of Hidden Figures.

Early life
Pharrell Lanscilo Williams was born on April 5, 1973, in Virginia Beach, Virginia, the eldest of the three sons of teacher Carolyn and handyman  Williams. His ancestry goes back many generations in Virginia and North Carolina. One of his ancestors journeyed to West Africa in 1831, prompting other relatives to emigrate from the U.S. to Liberia in 1832. Williams met Chad Hugo in a seventh-grade summer band camp, where Williams played drums and Hugo played tenor saxophone. They attended Princess Anne High School where they were in the school band. Williams graduated from high school in 1991 and he attended Northwestern University for two years before dropping out.

Career

1992–2004: The Neptunes and N.E.R.D.
In the early 1990s, Williams formed a hip hop group named Surrounded by Idiots with Chad Hugo, Magoo, and cousin Timbaland; they disbanded before making any records. He then formed a four-piece "R&B-type" group, the Neptunes, with Hugo and friends Shay Haley and Mike Etheridge. They entered a high school talent show, where they were discovered by producer Teddy Riley, whose studio was next to the school. After graduating, the group signed with Riley.

Williams wrote Riley's verse on Wreckx-n-Effect's 1992 hit "Rump Shaker".  As the Neptunes, Williams and Hugo produced Noreaga's 1998 single "Superthug". The Neptunes began working with rap duo Clipse (rappers Pusha T and Malice) in the late 1990s, and worked on Clipse's album Exclusive Audio Footage, which was not released.

The Neptunes produced Mystikal's single "Shake Ya Ass" (2000), Jay-Z's single "I Just Wanna Love U (Give It 2 Me)" (2000), and Nelly's single "Hot in Herre" (2002). They worked with singer Kelis, producing her first two studio albums, Kaleidoscope (1999) and Wanderland (2001). In 2001, N.E.R.D., a band composed of Williams, Hugo, and Haley, released their debut album In Search of.... Williams and Hugo signed Clipse to Arista Records through Williams' Star Trak Entertainment imprint in 2001. The Neptunes produced songs on singer Babyface's 2001 album, Face2Face, including its lead single "There She Goes". The Neptunes produced the Britney Spears songs "I'm a Slave 4 U" and "Boys" for her third studio album, Britney (2001).

In 2002, Clipse released their debut album, Lord Willin', with produced entirely by the Neptunes. That year, the Neptunes produced numerous songs on Justin Timberlake's debut album Justified, including the singles "Señorita", "Like I Love You", and "Rock Your Body". In 2003, the Neptunes released a compilation album, Clones. According to an unnamed August 2003 survey cited by The Age, it was found the Neptunes produced almost 20% of songs played on British radio at the time; another survey in the US found they'd produced 43% of radio songs. The Neptunes produced Snoop Dogg's single "Drop It Like It's Hot" (2004), which also featured vocals from Williams.

2005–2009: In My Mind and collaborations 

The Neptunes produced Gwen Stefani's single "Hollaback Girl", which entered the Billboard Hot 100 at number 82 on the issue dated April 2, 2005, and topped the chart within six weeks of its release. In 2006, Williams released his debut solo album, In My Mind. It debuted at number 3 on the US Billboard 200. The Neptunes produced Clipse's second album, Hell Hath No Fury. The Neptunes produced several songs on Stefani's second album, The Sweet Escape (2006), including the promotional single, "Yummy", which features Williams. In December 2006, Williams was announced as a performer at Concert for Diana in Wembley Stadium, London on July 1, 2007. In 2007, the Neptunes produced on Jay-Z's tenth studio album, American Gangster.

Williams worked with Madonna for her eleventh studio album, Hard Candy (2008). In June 2008, an article in NME revealed that Williams was interested in producing the next album of American rock band the Strokes. Later that year, Williams worked on a remix album for Maroon 5, titled Call and Response: The Remix Album. N.E.R.D. released their third studio album, Seeing Sounds, in 2008.

Williams worked with Shakira on her songs "Did It Again", "Why Wait", "Good Stuff", and "Long Time" for her sixth studio album, She Wolf (2009). The following month, Williams made a guest appearance on French singer Uffie's debut album, which was released in early 2010. The Neptunes produced numerous songs on Clipse's third album, Til the Casket Drops (2009).

2010–2014: Despicable Me, Despicable Me 2 and solo international success

In 2010, Williams worked on the music score for the animated film Despicable Me with composers Hans Zimmer and Heitor Pereira. In 2010, N.E.R.D. released their fourth studio album, Nothing, through Star Trak. In late 2011, Williams worked on three tracks for Mike Posner's second album, Sky High. In 2012, Williams composed and produced the music for the 84th Academy Awards alongside Hans Zimmer.

In 2013, Williams collaborated with French electronic duo Daft Punk on the songs "Get Lucky" and "Lose Yourself to Dance", both included on Daft Punk's fourth studio album, Random Access Memories. "Get Lucky" peaked at number one on the UK Singles Chart and number two on the US Billboard 200.

In 2013, Williams collaborated with Azealia Banks with the song "ATM Jam". The song was initially intended for Banks' debut studio album, Broke with Expensive Taste (2014), but was later removed from the album after Banks blamed Williams for the song's poor commercial performance. Williams penned three new original songs, included alongside composer Heitor Pereira's score, for the film Despicable Me 2 (2013). These were "Just a Cloud Away", "Happy", and "Scream" (featuring CeeLo Green). His two original songs from the first film, "Despicable Me" and "Fun, Fun, Fun", were also reprised on the Despicable Me 2 soundtrack. He also participated in the drummer sessions of the soundtrack of Man of Steel by Hans Zimmer. In March 2013, Robin Thicke's single "Blurred Lines", written and produced by Williams, was released. The song peaked at number one in multiple countries, including the United Kingdom and the United States. In mid-2013, Williams was involved in two songs that sold a million copies in the UK: "Get Lucky" and "Blurred Lines".

In August 2013, Busta Rhymes talked about an unreleased "documentary album" by Williams where he talks about "inner-city strife and hardship". In November 2013, Williams released the first 24-hour music video for "Happy"; guest appearances included Magic Johnson, Steve Carell, Jimmy Kimmel, Odd Future, among others. On November 1, 2013, Williams performed with a gospel choir at Emanuel African Methodist Episcopal Church in Charleston, South Carolina, where nine black parishioners were shot and killed on June 17, 2015.

It was announced in December 2013 that Williams had been nominated for seven Grammy Awards, including Producer of the Year. In the same month, Williams signed a contract with Columbia Records, and announced an album set for release in 2014 that would feature "Happy". For "Happy", Williams was nominated for the Academy Award for Best Original Song. In February 2014, Major Lazer announced they would be releasing a five-track EP titled Apocalypse Soon on the 25th of that month. The EP, released via Mad Decent and Secretly Canadian, features Williams and Sean Paul, among others. The first single off the EP, which features Williams, is titled "Aerosol Can". Williams contributed a verse to Future's February 2014 single "Move That Dope", which also featured Pusha T and Casino over production from Mike Will Made It.

On February 18, 2014, Williams announced via Twitter that his second album, Girl, would be released on March 3, 2014.  The album was supported by a European concert tour, Dear Girl Tour. At the 86th Academy Awards on March 2, 2014, Williams's song "Happy" lost to "Let It Go" from Frozen. Afterwards, when GQ magazine asked Williams "how badly" did he want the Oscar, he responded: "When they read the results, my face was...frozen. But then I thought about it, and I just decided just to...let it go". At the Oscar Awards that same year, he wore a controversial outfit consisting of a tuxedo with shorts. In May 2014, Williams received an Innovator Award at the iHeartRadio Music Awards.

2014–present: The Voice, Something in the Water and other ventures

In March 2014, it was announced that Comme des Garçons would be releasing a unisex fragrance with Williams, named after his album Girl. On March 31, 2014, Williams was announced as a new coach for the seventh season of The Voice, replacing CeeLo Green. In June 2014, it was announced that Williams would make a guest appearance on the docu-series Sisterhood of Hip Hop. Williams co-composed the score for The Amazing Spider-Man 2 (2014) with Hans Zimmer, Johnny Marr, Michael Einziger, and David A. Stewart. Williams was the executive producer of Atlanta rapper T.I.'s ninth studio album, Paperwork, which was released on October 21, 2014, by Grand Hustle and Columbia Records. In May 2014, Williams curated an art show named after his album, Girl, at the Galerie Perrotin in Paris, France. The show included artists Takashi Murakami, JR, Daniel Arsham, and Marina Abramović, among others. Williams collaborated with Gwen Stefani with the song "Shine" for the animated film Paddington (2014).

In January 2015, Williams was announced as the musical director for a 7-continent Live Earth concert on June 18, 2015, to raise awareness about and pressure governments to act on climate change. On February 8, 2015, Williams made a cameo in an episode of The Simpsons entitled "Walking Big & Tall" where he comes to Springfield to write a new anthem for the town. Williams recorded three songs for the soundtrack to the 2015 animated film The SpongeBob Movie: Sponge Out of Water. On May 18, 2015, Team Pharrell had 16-year-old Sawyer Fredericks win the eighth season of The Voice.

At the 2015 Grammy Awards, Williams performed an orchestral rendition of "Happy" with Hans Zimmer and pianist Lang Lang that included a tribute to the Black Lives Matter movement, inspired by Eric Garner's death and the Ferguson unrest. In 2015, a unanimous jury determined that "Blurred Lines", which Williams co-wrote and produced, was an infringement of the 1977 Marvin Gaye song "Got to Give It Up".  The jury awarded the Gaye family $7.4 million in damages for the copyright infringement based on profits generated. In October 2015, the Tisch School of the Arts at New York University named Williams as their artist-in-residence. He gave the 2017 commencement address at the university and received an honorary Doctor of Fine Arts degree on May 17, 2017. In 2018, Williams worked with Ariana Grande for her fourth studio album, Sweetener (2018). He produced several songs on the album, and is featured on the song "Blazed".

In March 2019, Williams and the city of Virginia Beach announced the launch of a three-day music and cultural festival titled Something in the Water, to be held during College Beach Weekend, April 26–28, on the Virginia Beach Oceanfront. The festival lineup included Travis Scott, Migos, Janelle Monáe, SZA, Rosalía, Anderson .Paak, Jhené Aiko, Mac DeMarco, Maggie Rogers, Lil Uzi Vert, Missy Elliott, Pusha T, Dave Matthews Band, and DRAM. The first day of the festival was cancelled due to severe storms. The "Pharrell and Friends" set that closed the festival's second day, featured Williams and a lineup of guests, including Jay-Z, Diddy, Busta Rhymes, Usher, Snoop Dogg, Missy Elliott, Timbaland, Charlie Wilson, and Tyler, the Creator.  The festival's final day featured Trey Songz, Chris Brown, Lil Duval, and members of SWV and Blackstreet. Williams produced five songs for Walt Disney Pictures' The Lion King (2019), marking his third collaboration with composer Hans Zimmer. In October 2019, Williams stated that he now regrets being associated with the 2013 song "Blurred Lines", which received intense backlash for its apparent sexist themes.

Artistry
In the past, Williams has stated that he does not have any direct musical influences, but he has expressed his admiration for several musicians, including Michael Jackson, J Dilla, Stevie Wonder, Donny Hathaway, Marvin Gaye, Rakim, and Q-Tip. Williams explained that A Tribe Called Quest's debut album, People's Instinctive Travels and the Paths of Rhythm (1990), caused a "turning point" in his life, which "made him see that music was art".

Business ventures
In 2005, Williams partnered with Japanese fashion icon Nigo to create the streetwear brands Billionaire Boys Club and Ice Cream footwear. In 2008, Williams co-designed a series of eyewear and jewelry for Louis Vuitton. In 2008, Williams founded a non-profit organization called "From One Hand To AnOTHER" (FOHTA). In 2009, Williams unveiled a collaborative sculpture with Takashi Murakami at Art Basel, which spoke to the metaphor of value. In May 2011, it was announced that Williams would serve as creative director of KarmaloopTV alongside founder and CEO Greg Selkoe and former AMC president Katie McEnroe.

In May 2012, Williams launched the social media venture I Am Other. In August 2013, Williams created a line of sunglasses for fashion brand Moncler called "Moncler Lunettes". In 2014, Williams entered a long-term partnership with Adidas. His Adidas NMD "Human Race" collection was released on July 23, 2016. In February 2014, Williams announced a collaboration between G-Star Raw and his textile company Bionic Yarn called "RAW for the Oceans," a collection of denim made from recycled plastic that is found in the ocean. The project was presented at the American Museum of Natural History in New York City.

In 2014, Williams appeared on a cover designed by French artist Grégoire Guillemin of New York-based men fashion magazine Adon, covering the collaboration. Williams released a collection for retail giant Uniqlo in April 2014 entitled "i am OTHER". It was created with Nigo, creative director of UT, the company's T-shirt division. In 2014, Williams worked on art with Emmanuel Perrotin and a French manufacturer, Domeau & Pérès. In June 2014, artist collective Rizzoli published a book by FriendsWithYou, We Are Friends With You, that featured contributions from Williams, Alejandro Jodorowsky, and Peter Doroshenko. Williams was the executive producer of the 2015 crime comedy-drama film Dope.

In 2017, Williams designed a €1,000 sneaker in collaboration with Chanel and Adidas. Verizon partnered with Williams on April 26, 2019, to launch a tech-fused music curriculum in a nationwide Verizon Foundation Learning schools. The education organization under Verizon Foundation works toward providing free technology, internet access, technology-focused curriculum to under-resourced middle schools. In November 2020, Williams launched Humanrace, a skin care brand. In December 2021, Williams would launch the winter line "Premium basics" together with Adidas Originals.

In June 2022, Doodles announced Williams as its Chief Brand Officer. Additionally, Doodles have set a release date for Williams to release a Doodles album that will be available to stream in addition to be sold exclusively as NFTs.

On February 14, 2023, Louis Vuitton announced that Williams had been appointed the fashion house's new men's creative director, a position left vacant by the death of Virgil Abloh in 2021. Williams' first collection will be displayed during the Paris Men's Fashion Week in June 2023.

Personal life
Williams married his longtime partner, model and fashion designer Helen Lasichanh, on October 12, 2013. The couple have four children together: son Rocket (born in 2008) and triplets (born in January 2017). The Despicable Me song "Rocket's Theme" was written in honor of their son Rocket.

In 2005, Williams was voted "Best Dressed Man in the World" by Esquire. He is a fan of the science fiction series Star Trek, as indicated by his consistent use of the Vulcan salute to signify his label name, Star Trak. Williams is a skateboarder and has a half-pipe inside his home. In 2011, Williams announced that he is building a $35 million after-school center in his home town, Virginia Beach. In 2015, Williams bought a house in the Laurel Canyon neighborhood of Los Angeles. In 2019, Williams offered internships to 144 students at Promise Academy in Harlem, New York City.

On March 26, 2021, Williams' cousin Donovan Lynch was shot and killed by an officer from the Virginia Beach Police Department after "brandishing a handgun" following three shootings in the area. Williams has called for a federal investigation into the incident.

Discography

Solo albums
 In My Mind (2006)
 Girl (2014)
 Phriends, Vol. 1 (2023)

Collaboration albums
With N.E.R.D.
 In Search of... (2002)
 Fly or Die (2004)
 Seeing Sounds (2008)
 Nothing (2010)
 No One Ever Really Dies (2017)

With the Neptunes
 Clones (2003)

Filmography
 Despicable Me (2010) – Composer
 Despicable Me 2 (2013) – Composer
 The Voice (2014–16) – Himself
 The Simpsons (2015) - Himself (episode "Walking Big & Tall") (Voice role)
 Popstar: Never Stop Never Stopping (2016) – Himself
 Hidden Figures (2016) – Producer, composer
 Despicable Me 3 (2017) – Composer
 The Grinch (2018) – Narrator (Voice role)
 Black Is King (2020) – Special appearance
 North Hollywood (2020)
 A Man Named Scott (2021) - Himself
 Sing 2 (2021) - Alfonso (Voice role)

Tours
Dear Girl Tour (2014)

Videography

Awards

See also 
 Pharrell Williams v. Bridgeport Music
 List of people with synesthesia

References

External links

 
 

 
1973 births
Living people
20th-century African-American male singers
20th-century American rappers
21st-century African-American male singers
21st-century American businesspeople
21st-century American rappers
African-American film score composers
African-American male rappers
African-American male singer-songwriters
African-American record producers
American fashion businesspeople
American fashion designers
American male pop singers
American hip hop record producers
American hip hop singers
American music industry executives
American contemporary R&B singers
American textile industry businesspeople
APRA Award winners
Articles containing video clips
Brit Award winners
Businesspeople from Virginia
Child Rebel Soldier members
Columbia Records artists
Grammy Award winners for rap music
Judges in American reality television series
Interscope Records artists
Musicians from Virginia Beach, Virginia
N.E.R.D. members
Northwestern University alumni
Pop rappers
Princess Anne High School alumni
Rappers from Virginia
Record producers from Virginia
Remixers
Singer-songwriters from Virginia
The Neptunes members